Donna Lewis (born August 1959) is a Welsh singer. She is best known for the 1996 pop hit single "I Love You Always Forever", which peaked at number five on the UK Singles Chart, and also peaked within the top ten of the charts in Australia, Austria, Canada, France, Germany, New Zealand, Norway, and the United States. In the latter country, the song peaked at number two on the Billboard Hot 100 for nine weeks, having been held off the summit by the Bayside Boys Remix of "Macarena" by Los Del Rio. It also became the highest-charting single on the Billboard Hot 100 by a Welsh artist since Bonnie Tyler topped the chart with "Total Eclipse of the Heart" in 1983. Additionally, the single is tied third among songs with the longest runs at number two on the Billboard Hot 100 and at second for most weeks at number one on the Billboard Mainstream Top 40 chart. Lewis teamed up with Richard Marx on the 1997 adult contemporary hit "At the Beginning" for the Anastasia soundtrack. In 1997, Lewis was nominated for the Brit Award for Best British Female Artist.

After releasing her second album Blue Planet, Lewis left Atlantic Records and independently released albums Be Still and In the Pink. Her album Brand New Day was produced by David Torn and featured Ethan Iverson, Reid Anderson and Dave King.

Biography
There are conflicting accounts regarding Lewis's birth date. According to her biography on the Billboard and AllMusic websites, written by employees of Rovi, and her BBC page, she was born on 6 August 1973. The following information is consistent with all sources: Lewis was born in Cardiff. She began playing the piano at the age of six. Her father, an amateur jazz pianist and guitarist lent encouragement, and at 14, she began composing original songs. Her formal training was at the Royal Welsh College of Music and Drama in Cardiff, where she majored in classical composition for piano and flute. Lewis then went on to teach music for a year in Sussex before moving to Birmingham to sing in a bar band. During that time she set up a home studio and began recording demos. She became a popular live attraction and circa 1993 began sending her demos to record labels. Atlantic Records signed her in 1994.

An article in People from November 1996 presents a different timeline of these events. It states that Lewis's graduation from the Royal Welsh College took place in 1979 and that she played in piano bars throughout Britain and Europe for a period of five years, so like many people in the public eye, there may have been attempts to make her age appear younger than she really is. In November 1996, she had been married for ten years to her road manager and "[gave] her age as in her 30s". This information, if correct, would imply that she was born between 1957 and 1966. This is roughly consistent with a statement Lewis made in an interview in 2015: "When I was in the pop world [...], I wasn't a 19 year old—I was 30 or something like that." The context suggests that this refers to the time when she got her Atlantic record deal. The biography on Lewis's own website does not date events prior to 1996. An article in Entertainment Weekly from September 1996 states that Lewis "won't reveal her age—she and her husband/manager, Martin Harris, have been married for nine years, so 'you know I'm not 21'". According to Companies House records for 'Donna Lewis Limited', of which both Donna Lewis ('Singer Songwriter') and her husband Martin Harris ('Business Manager') were directors, she was born in August 1959.

In 1996, Atlantic Records released Lewis's first single, "I Love You Always Forever", a love song which was a hit on VH1. It was also successful on U.S. radio, staying at No. 2 on the Billboard Hot 100 for nine consecutive weeks, and spending 13 consecutive weeks at No. 1 on the airplay chart. It exceeded one million "spins" on radio, to claim its place in music industry history as the most-played single up to that point. The single reached No. 5 on the UK Singles Chart in 1996, and spent 14 weeks in the chart. It helped her debut album, Now in a Minute, to No. 31 in the U.S. Billboard 200 chart, and No. 52 in the UK Albums Chart. It was certified platinum in the U.S.

Lewis recorded "At the Beginning" with Richard Marx for the 1997 film Anastasia. Her second LP, Blue Planet (1998), won critical acclaim, but it was largely overlooked by the public. Although it produced a minor hit in continental Europe and Asia, "I Could Be the One", and a U.S. No. 1 dance single, "Love Him", Lewis parted ways with Atlantic Records and independently produced her third LP, Be Still (2002), which featured her on an almost entirely acoustic set. During the early 2000s, Lewis was featured as a guest vocalist on several trance music/house music recordings. Her fourth LP, In the Pink, was released in 2008; its first single was "Shout," which was included in the soundtrack to the Marian Quinn film 32A. Lewis also sang lead vocals for her side project, Chute, which released their debut EP in April 2010. In March 2015, she released Brand New Day, her first full-length LP in nearly a decade.

Personal life
Lewis is married to Martin Harris, who is also her business manager. She resides in Boiceville, New York and has one son, Archie.

Discography

Studio albums

Singles

Featured singles

Collaborations
 The Seduction of Claude Debussy – Art of Noise [guest vocalist] (2000)
 Take Me Over – Dino Lenny [guest vocalist] (2001)
 When the Rain Comes Down – [guest vocalist] (2001)
 Dancing Angel – Ryan Farish [guest vocalist] (2010)
 Chute (EP) – [lead singer] (2010)
 "Running Up That Hill" – David Baron [vocals] (2019)
 "Distance" - Michael Whalen [vocals] (2022)

Awards and nominations
{| class=wikitable
|-
! Year !! Awards !! Work !! Category !! Result !! Ref.
|-
| rowspan=3|1997
| Brit Awards
| Herself
| British Female Solo Artist
| 
|-
| RSH Gold Awards
| rowspan=3|"I Love You Always Forever"
| Airplay Hit of the Year 
| 
|-
| rowspan=2|ASCAP Pop Music Awards
| rowspan=2|Most Performed Song
| 
| 
|-
| 1999
| 
|

See also
 List of number-one dance hits (United States)
 List of artists who reached number one on the U.S. Dance chart

References

External links
 Official website
 

Living people
Alumni of the Royal Welsh College of Music & Drama
Atlantic Records artists
British women record producers
Palmetto Records artists
Singers from Cardiff
Welsh pop pianists
Welsh pop singers
Welsh record producers
Welsh singer-songwriters
Year of birth missing (living people)
21st-century pianists
21st-century Welsh women singers
20th-century Welsh women singers
20th-century women pianists
21st-century women pianists
Whirlwind Recordings artists